The South Vietnam Independence Cup was an invitational football tournament in South Vietnam that took place on several occasions between 1961 and 1974.

References 

International association football competitions hosted by Vietnam
Football cup competitions in Vietnam
International men's association football invitational tournaments